Skip Rollins is a New Hampshire politician.

Career
On November 6, 2012, Rollins was elected to the New Hampshire House of Representatives where he represents the Sullivan 6 district. Rollins assumed office on December 5, 2012. Rollins is a Republican.

Personal life
Rollins resides in Newport, New Hampshire.

References

Living people
People from Newport, New Hampshire
Republican Party members of the New Hampshire House of Representatives
21st-century American politicians
Year of birth missing (living people)